The 2011 NCAA Division I Outdoor Track and Field Championships were contested at the 90th annual NCAA-sanctioned track meet to determine the individual and team champions of men's and women's Division I collegiate outdoor track and field in the United States.

This year's meet, the 30th with both men's and women's championships, was held June 8–11, 2011 at Drake Stadium at Drake University in Des Moines, Iowa. 

Two-time defending champions for both men and women, Texas A&M again won both titles, the Aggies' third titles at each of their respective championships.

Team results 
 Note: Top 10 only
 (DC) = Defending champions
Full results

Men's standings

Women's standings

References

NCAA Men's Outdoor Track and Field Championship
NCAA Women's Outdoor Track and Field Championship
NCAA Division I Outdoor Track And Field Championships
NCAA Division I Outdoor Track And Field Championships